Ayers Creek is a stream of Antigua and Barbuda.  It is located on the island of Antigua.

See also
List of rivers of Antigua and Barbuda

References

Rivers of Antigua and Barbuda